Events from the year 1834 in Sweden

Incumbents
 Monarch – Charles XIV John

Events
 The famous coffee house Tysta Mari is opened in Stockholm. 
 - First issue of the paper Västerviks-Tidningen
 - Drottningens juvelsmycke by Carl Jonas Love Almquist.
 - Presidentens döttrar by Fredrika Bremer.

Births
 13 February - Alfred Wahlberg, painter  (died 1906) 
 23 April - Adolf Hedin, publisher, and politician  (died 1905) 
 1 March - Hildegard Werner, musical conductor and a journalist  (died 1911)
 Ottilia Littmarck, actress (died 1929)

Deaths
 16 June - Giovanna Bassi, ballerina  (born 1762) 
 - Johanna Lohm, educator  (born 1747) 
 - Charlotta Aurora De Geer, courtier  (born 1779) 
 - Ulrika Melin, artist (born 1767) 
 - Margaretha Heijkenskjöld, traveler and dress reformer  (born 1781)

References

 
Years of the 19th century in Sweden
Sweden